Arlene Perly Rae (born 1949) is a Canadian journalist, literary critic and author. She is married to Canadian Ambassador to the United Nations Bob Rae.

Early years
Perly Rae was born in 1949 and educated at the University of Toronto.

Career 
Perly Rae was a longtime reviewer of children's literature for the Toronto Star. In 1997, she published Everybody's Favourites, a consumer guide to children's literature which evaluated some of the best books in the genre. She has also written as a freelancer for The Globe and Mail, Quill and Quire and Maclean's.

Perly Rae is a past vice-president of the Canadian Jewish Congress. and her interest in the welfare of children has led her to be a part of the national Campaign Against Child Poverty. She has also been on the boards of publisher McClelland and Stewart, the Stratford Festival, and World Literacy of Canada, as well as on the Steering Committee for the United Way of Greater Toronto. She is currently co-chairing the YWCA's Elm Centre Capital Campaign, a project set to create 300 units of permanent housing for women and women-led families in Toronto. In July 2016, she joined the board of Confederation Centre of the Arts, Canada's National Memorial to the Fathers of Confederation, in Prince Edward Island.

Perly Rae is frequently invited to give speeches on such diverse topics as literacy, combating racism, and the importance of the arts.

Family life
Perly Rae and her husband have three daughters. The family are members of Holy Blossom Temple, a Reform Jewish congregation in Toronto.

References 

Canadian children's writers
Canadian columnists
Canadian literary critics
Women literary critics
Canadian newspaper editors
Canadian Reform Jews
Canadian women journalists
Canadian women non-fiction writers
Jewish women writers
Living people
Maclean's writers and editors
Spouses of Canadian politicians
The Globe and Mail columnists
Toronto Star people
University of Toronto alumni
Canadian women columnists
Women newspaper editors
Canadian women children's writers
1949 births
20th-century Canadian non-fiction writers
20th-century Canadian women writers
21st-century Canadian non-fiction writers
21st-century Canadian women writers
Jewish Canadian journalists